Beaurainville is a commune in the Pas-de-Calais department in the Hauts-de-France region in northern France.

Geography
Beaurainville is a small town situated some 6 miles (10 km) southeast of Montreuil-sur-Mer, on the D130 road and on the banks of the river Canche.

History
In 1064, two years before the Battle of Hastings, Harold Godwinson, then Earl of Wessex, was shipwrecked on the shores of Ponthieu and captured by Guy I, Count of Ponthieu (d.1100) who took him to his castle of Beaurain, situated  up the River Canche from the English Channel coast, (now Le Touquet), as the Bayeux Tapestry relates: HIC APPREHENDIT WIDO HAROLDUM ET DUXIT EUM AD BELREM ET IBI EUM TENUIT ("Here Guy seized Harold and led him to Beaurain and held him there"). Duke William of Normandy demanded the release of the earl, and Count Guy delivered Harold Godwinson up after being paid a ransom for him.

Population

Views

See also
 Communes of the Pas-de-Calais department

References

Communes of Pas-de-Calais